Frederick Marsh may refer to:

 Frederick Marsh (cricketer) (1875–1927), English cricketer
 Frederick Dana Marsh (1872–1961), American illustrator
 Howard Marsh (surgeon) (Frederick Howard Marsh, 1839–1915), surgeon and academic

See also
 Fred Marsh (1924–2006), American infielder in Major League Baseball
 F. S. Marsh (Fred Shipley Marsh, 1886–1953), English clergyman and theologian